Linus Parker "Bullet" Hall (December 10, 1916 – February 8, 2005) was a professional American football player for the Cleveland Rams and the San Francisco 49ers. In his rookie season, Hall led the league in passing, was second in passing yardage, and fifth in rushing yards.  He was named the league's Most Valuable Player in 1939 and was the first professional player to complete over 100 passes in a single season.

He spent four seasons with the Rams, and after returning from military service during World War II, Hall played with the AAFC's San Francisco 49ers during their inaugural season.  He moved to Memphis, Tennessee, after retiring from football and worked in the lumber business.

See also

 List of NCAA major college football yearly scoring leaders (1938)
 List of National Football League annual punting yards leaders

References

External links
 
 

1916 births
2005 deaths
American football quarterbacks
Cleveland Rams players
United States Navy personnel of World War II
Del Monte Pre-Flight Navyators football players
Ole Miss Rebels football players
Saint Mary's Pre-Flight Air Devils football players
San Francisco 49ers (AAFC) players
All-American college football players
College Football Hall of Fame inductees
People from Tunica, Mississippi
Players of American football from Mississippi
National Football League Most Valuable Player Award winners
San Francisco 49ers players